The military history of Ireland comprises thousands of years of armed actions in the territory encompassing the island of Ireland.

Ireland was never invaded by the Roman Empire, and the island remained a warring collection of separate kingdoms throughout its early history. Although it is known that the Romans traded with the Irish kingdoms, historically it was thought that the Romans never established a military presence in Ireland. In recent times the find of ruins of a possibly Roman fort in Drumanagh near Dublin has questioned this belief.

After the November 2015 Paris attacks killed more than 130 people in France, the French government invoked a mutual defence clause of the Treaty of Lisbon, asking for military assistance from the European Union. The Irish government agreed to deploy peacekeeping troops to Mali in order to free up French troops stationed there for deployment elsewhere.

Royal Air Force stations in Northern Ireland

Former Royal Air Force airfields in the Republic

See also
Irish History
List of wars in Ireland
List of conflicts in Ireland
Irish Defence Forces
Irish regiments of the British Army
List of Irish uprisings
Irish military diaspora

References

Citations

Bibliography
https://web.archive.org/web/20160313105450/http://archaeologyuk.org/ba/ba14/BA14FEAT.HTML

 
Battles involving Ireland
Rebellions in Ireland
Wars involving Ireland